Liotella is a genus of minute sea snails or micromolluscs, marine gastropod molluscs in the family Skeneidae.

Description
The shells lack a thickened peristome. The shell is depressed. In some species the shell is coiled nearly into one plane, in others it is somewhat more elevated. The whorls are loosely coiled. The operculum is multispiral with a central nucleus. The sculpture shows strong transverse ribs. The spiral sculpture consists of fine lirae between the ribs or is sometimes almost or entirely obsolete.

Species
Species within the genus Liotella include:
 Liotella annulata (Tenison Woods, 1874)
 Liotella anxia (Hedley, 1909)
 Liotella aupouria Powell, 1937
 Liotella cancellata (Krauss, 1848)
 Liotella capitata (Hedley, 1907)
 Liotella compacta (Petterd, 1884)
 Liotella corona (Hedley, 1902)
 Liotella crassicostata (Strebel, 1908)
 Liotella elegans Laseron, 1958
 Liotella elegans darwinensis  
 Liotella endeavourensis Dell, 1990
 Liotella indigens Finlay, 1927
 Liotella johnstoni (Beddome, 1883)
 Liotella kilcundae (Gatliff & Gabriel, 1914)
 Liotella mackenae Dell, 1956
  Liotella petalifera (Hedley & May, 1908)
 Liotella polypleura (Hedley, 1904)
 Liotella pulcherrima (Henn & Brazier, 1894)
 Liotella rotula (Suter, 1908)
 Liotella vercoi (Gatliff & Gabriel, 1914)
Species brought into synonymy
 Liotella coatsiana Melvill & Standen, 1912: synonym of Lodderia coatsiana (Melvill & Standen, 1912)
 Liotella gravicosta Laseron, 1954: synonym of Liotella petalifera (Hedley & May, 1908) 
 Liotella kirai Habe, 1961: synonym of Munditiella kirai (Habe, 1961)
 Liotella littoralis Laseron, 1954: synonym of Liotella johnstoni (Beddome, 1883) 
 Liotella parvirota Laseron, 1954: synonym of Liotella kilcundae (Gatliff & Gabriel, 1914) 
 Liotella patonga Laseron, 1954: synonym of Liotella annulata (Tenison Woods, 1874) 
 Liotella princeps Laseron, 1954: synonym of Liotella johnstoni (Beddome, 1883)

References

External links
 Seashells of New South Wales : images of shells

Further reading 
 Iredale, 1915, Transactions of the New Zealand Institute, 47: 442
 Powell A. W. B., New Zealand Mollusca, William Collins Publishers Ltd, Auckland, New Zealand 1979 
 GBIF
 Spencer, H.; Marshall. B. (2009). All Mollusca except Opisthobranchia. In: Gordon, D. (Ed.) (2009). New Zealand Inventory of Biodiversity. Volume One: Kingdom Animalia. 584 pp

 
Skeneidae
Gastropod genera